In Japan, desserts were being made for centuries well before sugar was made widely available. Many desserts commonly available in Japan can be traced back for hundreds of years. Though many desserts and sweets date back to the Edo period (1603–1867) and Meiji period (1868–1911), many modern-day sweets and desserts originating from Japan also exist.

Japanese desserts

 
 
 
 Castella
 
 Coffee jelly
 Green tea ice cream
 Hakuto jelly
 
 Melonpan
 Mochi ice cream
 
 Purin
 Raindrop cake
 
 Tokyo banana

is a traditional Japanese confectionery which is often served with tea, especially the types made of mochi,  (azuki bean paste), and fruits.  is typically made from plant ingredients.  are made in a wide variety of shapes and consistencies and with diverse ingredients and preparation methods.  are popular across the country japan but are only available regionally or seasonally.

Types of

A

B

C

D

G

H

I

K

M

N

R
 Red bean paste

S
 
 
  (red bean soup)

T

U

W

Y

Gallery

Brands
 Black Thunder
 Fusen gum
 Hyōroku mochi
 Shiroi Koibito

See also

Japanese sweets and desserts
 Japanese cuisine – Sweets
 List of Japanese dishes – Japanese-style sweets

Related topics
 Cuisine
 List of desserts

References

External links
 
 
 

 
Dessert-related lists
Desserts and sweets